The Traitors is a British reality television series broadcast on BBC One, based on the Dutch series De Verraders, which premiered on 29 November 2022 and is hosted by Claudia Winkleman. 

Following the premise of other versions of De Verraders, the show features a group of contestants participating in a game similar to the party game Mafia - In which a small group of contestants become the titular "Traitors", and must work together to eliminate the other contestants order to win a grand prize, while the remaining contestants become "Faithful" and are tasked to discover and banish the Traitors by voting them out, in order to win the grand prize. 

The first week's episodes were uploaded onto BBC iPlayer following the airing of the first, with each subsequent episode being available on BBC One only before being uploaded to iPlayer.

On 27 February 2023, the BBC announced that the show had been renewed for a second series, with Winkleman returning to host.

Format
22 strangers arrive at a castle in the Scottish Highlands as "Faithful" contestants – hoping to share a prize fund worth up to £120,000. Among them are the "Traitors" – a group of contestants selected by host Claudia Winkleman on the first day, whose goal is to eliminate the Faithfuls and claim the prize for themselves. Should the Faithful contestants eliminate all the Traitors, they will share the prize fund, but if any Traitors make it to the end, they win the money instead.

Each night, the Traitors come together and decide upon one Faithful contestant to "murder" – and that person will leave the game immediately. The remaining Faithful contestants will not know who has been eliminated until the following day when that person does not enter the Castle for breakfast. The group then take part in a mission to win money for the prize fund. Some challenges will also offer an opportunity for players to visit the Armoury - during which one player will randomly and secretly be awarded the Shield - which awards the player immunity from being Murdered, but not from the Banishment Vote. An attempted murder on the shield holder will result in no player being eliminated by Murder.

At the end of each day, the players will participate in a Round Table, where the players discuss who to vote out before individually voting for a player to be banished. Players cast their votes privately before revealing their votes in turn to everyone once all votes are locked-in, and may give a brief rationale for the vote. The person who received the most votes for banishment is banished from the game and must reveal their affiliation. If a Traitor is eliminated, the remaining Traitors may be given the option to recruit a Faithful to join them. If the Faithful accepts, they become a Traitor from that point on.

Production

The UK show was ordered by the BBC in October 2021, following the airing of the Dutch series earlier that year. The series was to be produced by Studio Lambert Scotland.

The show was recorded in May 2022, and action took place at Ardross Castle in Scotland.

Presenter Claudia Winkleman was initially hesitant to host the programme but after watching the Dutch series became "obsessed" and jokingly "booked a train to Scotland".

Contestants
22 contestants competed on the first series of The Traitors. In a minor twist, Alex & Tom had a pre-existing relationship as they were dating before competing in the series.

Amos and Kieran were apparently banished from the game, on arrival at the castle, after placing themselves in a line as least likely to win the show. However, they were both reintroduced to the show in a twist during episode 5.

Voting history

Key
  The contestant was a Faithful.
  The contestant was a Traitor.
  The contestant was ineligible to vote.
  The contestant casting this vote was on Trial at this Round Table and were one of the only people subsequently eligible for being Murdered.
  The contestant casting this vote won a Shield and was immune from being murdered, but was still eligible for Banishment.

Notes

Missions

Episodes

Notes

Critical reception 
The series was generally well received by critics, who praised the programme for being "fresh, yet familiar", likening it to party games such as Mafia or wink murder. Rebecca Nicholson of The Guardian says the format "feels like a revival of the early, more innocent days of reality TV", calling it "The White Lotus meets Big Brother 1". Harrison Brocklehurst, The Tab, believed that social media helped the success of the show: "The memes and everyone live-tweeting it has played a big part in its success. Nobody wants to miss out on a reality TV show that everyone is talking about." Isobel Lewis of The Independent was more critical, however, saying it "definitely isn’t a perfect reality show, or even the best in its genre right now, but it is pretty entertaining."

International broadcast
In Australia, the series was made available to stream on 10 Play in March 2023, as a companion to the Australian version aired by the network.

In the United States, the show is available to stream on Peacock, the broadcaster of the American version.

Aftermath
Contestant Maddy Smedley urged others to think carefully about applying for the next show, and said she “wouldn’t recommend it for people for their sanity and mental health”.

References

External links
 
 
 

2022 British television series debuts
2020s British reality television series
2020s British game shows
BBC television game shows
BBC reality television shows
Television shows filmed in Scotland
Television shows set in Scotland
British television series based on Dutch television series
English-language television shows
Television series by All3Media